Andrea Ferrari (16 September 1915 – 24 February 2011) was an Italian sailor who competed in the 1952 Summer Olympics.

References

External links
 

1915 births
2011 deaths
Italian male sailors (sport)
Olympic sailors of Italy
Sailors at the 1952 Summer Olympics – 6 Metre